Saint Victor may refer to:

 Saint Victor of Damascus, martyr, 2nd century, see Saints Victor and Corona (died c. 170)
 Saint Pope Victor I (died 199), martyr
 Saint Victor of Marseilles (died c. 290)
 Saint Victor Maurus (died ca. 303 in Milan), martyr
 Saint Victorinus of Pettau (died 303 or 304)
 Saints Vincent, Orontius, and Victor (died 305), martyrs
 Victor of Vita born circa 430
 Saint Victor of Turin (died 465)
 Saint Victor of Xanten (died 4th century), martyr
 Saint Victor of Arcis (7th century), hermit and monk

See also  
 Saint-Victor (disambiguation)
 Victor (disambiguation)
 St. Victor, Saskatchewan, a community in Saskatchewan, Canada
 St. Victor Petroglyphs Provincial Park, a park in Saskatchewan, Canada
 St. Victor's Abbey, Marseille
 St. Victor's Abbey, Paris
 SAINT Victor, a model of the Springfield Armory SAINT rifle series
 Saint Victor Catholic Church, a Roman Catholic church in West Hollywood, California
 School of Saint Victor